Karl Oskar Staffan Seeberg (Stockholm, August 4, 1938) is a Swedish writer and physician. He lives currently in Båstad.

His first novel P:s lidanden was published in 1966, and his breakthrough came in 1970 with Vägen genom Vasaparken.

He got his PhD in medicine in 1975. His works are very critical of the society.

Works 
1966 – P:s lidanden
1967 – Grodorna
1968 – Fem berättelser
1970 – Vägen genom Vasaparken
1971 – Lungfisken
1975 – Cancerkandidaterna
1977 – Holobukk
1980 – Grönlandsskogen
1982 – Där havet börjar
1985 – Stellas frihet
1990 – Därför
1995 – Aprilfloden
1997 – Lauras ansikte
2000 – Ariadnes spår
2005 – Sjöjungfruns namn

Awards 
 1966 – Eckersteinska literature prize
 1970 – Aftonbladet literature prize

References

Living people
1938 births
Swedish medical writers
Swedish writers
Physicians from Stockholm